Carmine is a male given name of Italian origins. It is the masculine version of "Carmen" and a variant of "Carmelo". Notable people with the name include:
 Carmine Abate (born 1954), Italian writer
 Carmine Abbagnale (born 1962), Italian competition rower
 Carmine Agnello (born 1960), American alleged mobster 
 Carmine Alfieri (born 1943), Italian fugitive
 Carmine Appice (born 1946), American drummer
 Carmine Benincasa (1947-2020), Italian art critic
 Carmine Caracciolo, 5th Prince of Santo Buono (1671-1726), grandee of Spain
 Carmine Cardamone (born 1950), American politician
 Carmine Caridi (1934-2019), American film actor
 Carmine Chiappetta (born 2003), Swiss football player
 Carmine Cirella (born 1960), Canadian ice hockey player
 Carmine Coppola (1910-1991), American composer
 Carmine Coppola (footballer) (born 1979), Italian footballer
 Carmine Crocco (1830-1905), Italian brigand
 Carmine Cucciniello (born 1988), Italian football player
 Carmine de Laurentiis, Italian mandolist
 Carmine DeSapio (1908-2004), American politician, Tammany Hall boss
 Carmine DeSopo (born 1940), American politician
 Carmine Di Giandomenico (born 1973), Italian visual artist
 Carmine Di Sibio (born 1963), American chief executive
 Carmine Esposito (born 1970), Italian footballer
 Carmine Fatico (1910-1991), American mobster
 Carmine Furletti (1926-2008), Brazilian football player
 Carmine Galante (1910–1979), American mobster
 Carmine Gallo (born 1965), American author
 Carmine Gallone (1885-1973), Italian film director
 Carmine Biagio Gatti (born 1988), Italian football player
 Carmine Gautieri (born 1970), Italian football coach
 Carmine Gentile, American politician
 Carmine Gentile (painter) (1678-1763), Italian painter
 Carmine Giordani (1685-1758), Italian composer
 Carmine Giordano (born 1982), Italian football player
 Carmine Giorgi (1910-1965), Brazilian athlete
 Carmine Giorgione (born 1991), Italian footballer
 Carmine Giovinazzo (born 1973), American actor
 Carmine Gorga (born 1935), Italian-American economist
 Carmine Gori-Merosi (1810-1886), Italian bishop
 Carmine Guida (born 1975), American musician
 Carmine Infantino (1925-2013), American comic book artist and editor
 Carmine Isacco (born 1970), Canadian soccer player
 Carmine Lombardozzi (1913-1992), American mobster
 Carmine J. Marasco (1891–1960), American politician and judge
 Carmine Marcantonio (born 1954), Canadian retired soccer player
 Carmine Mirabelli (1889-1951), Brazilian spiritual medium
 Carmine Molaro (born 1975), Italian boxer
 Carmine Nigro (1910-2001), American chess player
 Carmine Palumbo (born 1993), Italian footballer
 Carmine Pariante (born 1966), British psychiatrist
 Carmine Parlato (born 1970), Italian football manager
 Carmine Pecorelli (1928–1979), Italian journalist
 Carmine Persico (1933–2019), American mobster
 Carmine Preziosi (born 1943), Italian bicycler
 Carmine Rocco (1912-1982), Italian prelate
 Carmine Rojas (born 1953), American bassist
 Carmine Romano (1935-2011), American mobster
 Carmine Saponetti (1913-1990), Italian cyclist
 Carmine Savino (1911-1993), American politician
 Carmine Schiavone (1943-2015), Italian politician
 Carmine Sciandra (born 1952), American gangster
 Carmine Senise (1883-1958), Italian police officer
 Carmine Sessa (born 1951), Italian-American mobster
 Carmine Setola (born 1999), Italian footballer
 Carmine Starnino (born 1970), Canadian poet
 Carmine Tommasone (born 1984), Italian boxer
 Carmine Tramunti (1910-1978), Italian-American mobster
 Carmine Tucci (1933-1990), Italian ice hockey player
 Carmine Verduci (1959-2014), Italian-Canadian mobster
 Carmine Vingo (1929-2015), American boxer
 Carmine Zoccali (born 1947), Italian nephrologist

Fictional characters 
 Carmine, a alligator in the 2006 Disney animated film The Wild
 Carmine, the purple music race car and a character from the Disney animated TV series Little Einsteins season 2 episode Carmine's Big Race
 Carmine Falcone, a DC comics character.
 Carmine Lupertazzi, a character from the show The Sopranos
 Little Carmine, Lupertazzi's son
 Carmine Lorenzo, the fictional airport Captain of Police in Die Hard 2 played by Dennis Franz 
 Carmine "The Big Ragoo" Ragusa, a character from the show Laverne & Shirley
 Carmine, Cerise Hood's pet dire wolf from the Mattel franchise Ever After High
 Carmine, Family name in the games “Gears of War”
Carmine Esclados, the main antagonist of the RWBY spinoff novel RWBY: After the Fall

See also
Carmin (disambiguation), includes list of people with name Carmin